Women are active in all aspects of classical music, such as instrumental performance, vocal performance, orchestral conducting, choral conducting, scholarly research, and contemporary composition. However, proportionately to men, their representation and recognition -especially at higher levels- falls a long way below their numbers.

Although women have not had roles in symphony orchestras until recently, it has been much more common for women to study musical instruments. In the 1800s, upper-class women often were expected to learn an instrument, often the harp, piano, guitar, or violin, or to learn to sing. It is only in recent years that women have performed in the soloist setting more frequently. Pianist (and composer) Clara Schumann and vocalist Jenny Lind were two rarer examples prominent in the nineteenth-century.

History 

One of the first historically recorded women in medieval music was Hildegard of Bingen, who wrote religious pieces in the 12th century. Women have also been necessary for the functioning of choirs, which require the upper register that women can sing, although Pope Leo IV (847–855 A.D.) banned women in choirs from singing in churches, and Pope Pius X banned women from church choirs in 1907. Antonio Vivaldi led an all-girl orchestra in 1714 at a school for girls.

Historically, women were expected to master instruments along with learning music basics such as reading music, writing music, and performing it. However, until the 20th century, it was seen as immoral to perform publicly and women were only expected to play in the private domestic setting. Until recently, women were not allowed to be taught at a conservatory level and were tracked into a less demanding curriculum that omitted topics that were considered complex. These subjects included composition, counterpoint, and orchestration. Women are even less encouraged to compose than perform it. The professional status of women composers was influenced by their family and marital status. Women who came from musical families and had the support of their husband and their father could make a name for themselves.

A prominent historic example is Élisabeth Jacquet de La Guerre, a French composer born in 1665. Her grandfather, Jehan Jacquet, and her father, Claude Jacquet, were harpsichord makers. Rather than just teaching his sons, Claude Jacquet taught both his sons and daughters how to survive and thrive in the world. This upbringing, support from her father, and her family's rich history of musicianship was a major stepping stone for her musical career. At the age of five, Louis XIV took notice of her when she performed at his palace of Versailles. This eventually led to her becoming a musician in the court of the Sun King, Louis XIV. She wrote most of her works for her king, which was common for the time. Titon du Tillet accorded her a place on his Mount Parnassus when she was only 26 years old. Despite that her one published opera, Céphale et Procris, only had 5 or 6 performances, she continued to compose throughout her life, producing a wide variety of pieces. After her death, her genius in compositions, her creativity in vocal and instrumental music, and her variety of genres are acknowledged. Her life and career success show that she was given a rare opportunity to succeed as a female composer, and how she took full advantage of it.

It used to be considered proper for a young woman in upper society to attain proficiency on a classical instrument, usually the piano, harp, classical guitar, or voice. Women's roles in music, whether it be performance or education, was meant for their private lives inside their homes, rather than public. Other than this, women were not trained as professionals, however, because it was considered immodest for a woman to perform in public. These etiquette guidelines were typically spread by books such as Letters to a Young Lady written by John Bennett in 1798, and Letters to Young Ladies written by Lydia Sigourney in 1844. Musical performance was seen as a feminine pursuit, and thus schools for women often had more of a focus on music than schools for boys. In fact, the first music conservatory in the United States, Music Vale Seminary, was established in 1835 for the purpose of teaching women music. The culture of women learning music was so strong in the 18th century that George Washington's step-granddaughter Eleanor Custis Parke and Thomas Jefferson's wife Martha Jefferson were musicians.

Women did not compose classical music often in the 18th century. While compositions written by women were acceptable in Europe and Great Britain, compositions written by American women were often vaguely attributed or unattributed.

From 1870 to 1910, women started to take more jobs in classical music, usually teaching positions. American Clara Baur was the first woman to found a conservatory, the University of Cincinnati – College-Conservatory of Music, in 1867. The growing American popularity of opera music in this time period also contributed to a rising number of women in classical music, as women were needed to sing prominent female parts.

20th century 
In 1936, Nadia Boulanger conducted a concert with the London Philharmonic, the first woman to do so. Boulanger also went on to conduct the Philadelphia Orchestra, Boston Symphony, and New York Philharmonic in the following years. Vítězslava Kaprálová conducted the Czech Philharmonic in 1937 and the BBC Orchestra (later known as the BBC Symphony Orchestra) in 1938 in London, during the 16th ISCM Festival.

Following the end of World War II, the number of women in classical music jobs greatly increased in the United States. In 1947, only 8% of symphony orchestra musicians were women, compared to 26.3% in 1982. The number of women in European orchestras, however, continued to remain low. Women in tenured composition positions at universities also remained very uncommon in the 1970s, with 10.6% of those positions occupied by women.

In 1984 Odaline de la Martinez became the first woman to conduct at a BBC Promenade Concert at the Royal Albert Hall.

21st century 
The ratio of women to men players in U.S. orchestras is roughly equal, but the ratio in European orchestras is still low. There are relatively few women conductors, but numbers are increasing, as figures like Marin Alsop, Barbara Hannigan, Susanna Mälkki and Mirga Gražinytė-Tyla gain public attention and popularity.

Women in orchestras
The first orchestra in the world to ever hire women musicians was the Queen's Hall Orchestra in London in 1913, led by Sir Henry Wood. Before 1913, women played in women-only orchestras, the first of which was founded by Mary Wurm in 1898 in Berlin. The first known women to join an American orchestra were Djina Ostrowska, first harpist, Helen Burr-Brand, second harpist, and Ida Divinoff, first violinist, who were accepted into the Detroit Symphony Orchestra by December 1918.

Women were nonexistent in most major music symphony orchestras up until the 1960s. This imbalance has been particularly notable in music directorships of symphony orchestras, with 4.1% of major orchestras in the United States led by a woman, as of November 2016, and out of the 150 recognized top conductors in the world, only 3.3% were women. The gap also extends to member positions in symphony orchestras. In 1982, the Berlin Philharmonic hired its first woman, Madeleine Carruzzo. In 2003, the Vienna Philharmonic appointed its first woman musician after 161 years of operating without women. In fact, there had been an explicit ban on women musicians in the Vienna Philharmonic until 1996, when the Philharmonic was threatened with budget cuts by the Austrian government.

Women composers
Sara Mohr-Pietsch estimates in an article for The Guardian that about 40% of living composers are female, and yet, she laments, only about 17% of names on music publishers lists are female. Research by the Boston Symphony Orchestra suggests a starker discrepancy; in programming for the top 22 US orchestras in 2014–2015, only 1.8% of composers were female. Recognising that, in historic times, opportunities for women as composers were (through unchallenged societal norms) far fewer, the work included a similar analysis considering the proportions of living composers programmed, but even within this sub-set of the data, the proportion of composers programmed who were women only reached 14.3%, far short of the near-parity that might be desired in these notionally more enlightened times, and only one third of Mohr-Pietsch's 40%.

In "The Power List: Why Women Aren't Equals In New Music Leadership and Innovation", Ellen McSweeney discusses six generic contributory factors identified by Sheryl Sandberg in Lean In: Women, Work and the Will to Lead which may have some effect on these numbers, all of which would require further addressing to bring a more truly level playing field.
 The sociological fact that women musicians, like all women, pay a "likability tax" when they are self-promoting, assertive, and successful.
 Women musicians are less likely to embark on high visibility projects, take professional risks, and conceive of themselves as leaders—which leaves them at a distinct disadvantage in developing entrepreneurial careers.
 Women consistently underestimate their own talents and abilities, leaving them at a disadvantage in the essential realm of self-promotion.
 When choosing whom to hire, men are significantly more likely to choose a man.
 Similarly, senior men are more likely to mentor young men than young women.
 Women are taught from an early age to worry about whether they can have children and a career.

Reactions
Kristin Kuster makes the point that "The message needs to be given that ...[composing] is something ...[women] can do and ...[music 'authorities'] want to hear from them", she said. "If these women aren't seeing that this is a possibility, they can't even self-select out."

Marin Alsop said that when her conducting career began to take off she assumed that there was a larger trend of women conductors making their way in the orchestra world. "I thought it was changing, and then it didn't change", she has said.

She is on record as saying that there can be a tendency to celebrate notable firsts or high-profile individual successes and just assume these one-offs mean a problem is solved. "You can't give up just because the box is ticked", Alsop said. "Just because Jennifer Higdon won the Pulitzer Prize [for composition] is no reason not to push for the next woman."

Redress 
Among the groups seeking to redress the gender imbalance in music have been:
 The International Alliance for Women in Music
 Fondazione Adkins Chiti: Donne in Musica founded by the late Patricia Adkins Chiti, a member organisation of the UNESCO International Music Council (see European Music Council).
 Women's Philharmonic Advocacy. Promoting the legacy of the legendary Women's Philharmonic, this organization supports American orchestras that program music by women composers.
 The Kapralova Society. Founded in 1998, the society publishes Kapralova Society Journal: A Journal of Women in Music.
 Women in Music (UK) 

Historic groups with similar aims have included the Society of Women Musicians in the UK.

See also
Lists of women in music
Women in music
List of African-American women in classical music

References